Sin-A-Matic is an album by Louis Logic, an American hip hop artist. The album's title does not refer to the porn film company Sin-A-Matic, but rather it is a play on words. Logic says that the album is supposed to be a "visual ride that presents itself the way a movie would without picture." The album's title sounds like the term "cinematic" referring to cinema, however he included the word "sin" to account for the uglier tales of the album.

Track listing

Personnel

Singles

References

External links
 Louis Logic on Solid Records
 Solid Records
 Louis Logic on Demigodz site

2003 albums
Louis Logic albums